Don't Look Back is an album released by blues singer-songwriter John Lee Hooker in 1997 that was co-produced by Van Morrison and Mike Kappus. Van Morrison also performed duets with Hooker on four of the tracks. The album was the Grammy winner in the Best Traditional Blues Album category in 1998. The title duet by Hooker and Morrison also won a Grammy for Best Pop Collaboration with Vocals.

John Lee Hooker and Van Morrison
The two singers had collaborated on several occasions over the years before this album was realized and had become personal friends. Morrison had first recorded the title song,  "Don't Look Back" on his debut album as the frontman for the Northern Irish band Them and according to one of the band members, Billy Harrison, the two first met in London in 1964. Their first collaboration was on Hooker's album, Never Get Out of These Blues Alive recorded in 1972, with a duet on the title song and Hooker's cover of Morrison's "T.B. Sheets".  They guested on each other's albums over the years with Hooker also appearing on two films with Morrison:  BBC's One Irish Rover and Morrison's 1990 video, Van Morrison The Concert.

Track listing
"Dimples"  (James Bracken, Hooker) – 3:59 L*
"The Healing Game"  (Van Morrison) – 5:09 M*
"Ain't No Big Thing"  (Hooker) – 5:19
"Don't Look Back"  (Hooker) – 6:41 M*
"Blues Before Sunrise"  (Leroy Carr, Hooker) – 6:41
"Spellbound" (Hooker, Michael Osborn) – 3:56
"Travellin' Blues"  (Hooker) – 5:35 M*
"I Love You Honey"  (Hooker, Freddy Williams) – 3:31
"Frisco Blues" (Hooker) – 3:47
"Red House"  (Jimi Hendrix) – 4:02
"Rainy Day"  (Hooker) – 5:50 M*
Notes
L – with Los Lobos band and also produced by Los Lobos with Mario Caldato Jr.
M – Duets with Van Morrison

Chart

Personnel
John Lee Hooker – vocals, guitar
Van Morrison – vocals, guitar, co-producer
David Hidalgo – guitar
César Rosas – guitar
Danny Caron – guitar
Conrad Lozano – bass guitar
Richard Cousins – bass guitar
Ruth Davies – acoustic bass
John Allair  – keyboards
Jim Pugh – keyboards
Charles Brown – keyboards
Roger Lewis – saxophone
Steve Berlin – baritone saxophone
Gregory Davis – trumpet
John "Juke" Logan – harmonica
Victor Bisetti – drums
Kevin Hayes – drums

Mike Kappus – co-producer, executive producer

Notes

References
Heylin, Clinton (2003). Can You Feel the Silence? Van Morrison: A New Biography, Chicago Review Press

External links
The Rosebud agency presents: Don't Look Back
 BluesRoad: Don't Look Back

1997 albums
John Lee Hooker albums
Virgin Records albums
Albums produced by Van Morrison